Leandro Antonio Martínez (born 15 October 1989) is an Argentine-Italian footballer who most recently played as a forward for Borgo San Donnino FC.

Biography

Parma and loans
Born in Buenos Aires, Argentina, Martínez moved to Italy in 2003. He was a member of Parma's Primavera under-20 team. At age 18, he was offered a professional contract of reported 5-year (or 3+2 years, as N.O.I.F. of FIGC only allowed a maximum of 3-year for Italians "young professional").  He made his Serie A debut on 27 April 2008, replaced Cristiano Lucarelli at 2nd half, at that time Parma already losing to Reggina 1–2.  His primavera team-mate Aleksandar Prijović also substituted Daniele Dessena on that match, and Parma eventually 1–2 lost with Reggina. Parma relegated to Serie B in June and Martínez was loaned to Ternana in August 2008. He failed to make his club debut and left the club for Carpenedolo in January 2009. On 1 September 2009 he left for South Tyrol but in December 2009 returned to Parma for family reason. In January 2010 he left for Swiss 1. Liga side Biaschesi.

AlbinoLeffe
On 12 July 2010, he was signed by Serie B side AlbinoLeffe for free. Since AlbinoLeffe had lost Francesco Ruopolo and Marco Cellini, Martínez formed a new striking line with Karamoko Cissé and Omar Torri, who played as backup players for AlbinoLeffe in the last season. The latter 2 scored 3 goals in the opening match, making AlbinoLeffe won fellow Serie B club Pescara 3–1 in Coppa Italia. However, Martínez soon dropped from starting line-up.

Martínez did not play any game in 2011–12 Serie B and followed by the club relegation and heavy fine due to 2011 Italian football scandal, Martínez was signed by Cremonese in August 2012.

Hungary
On 31 January 2013 his contract was terminated in a mutual consent and moved to Hungarian side Budapest Honvéd on the same day. He was presented on 1 February. After spending five months at the club he joined defending champion Győri ETO.

On 20 January 2015 he moved to Haladás. He left the club in December 2017.

Return to Italy
After one month and a half at Talleres de Remedios de Escalada in Argentina, Italien club GS Felino announced on 29 October 2019, that he had joined the club. Leandros brother, Emanuel, was also playing for Felino and as of Leandro's Instagram page, he also worked as a youth coach at the club.

On 12 December 2019, Martínez joined Borgo San Donnino FC alongside his brother, Emanuel.

International career
Martínez made his U20 debut on 10 September 2008 against Switzerland U20, a 2008–09 Four Nations Tournament match.

References

External links
Profile at Football.it 
FIGC National Team Data  
Profile at La Gazzetta dello Sport (2007–08)  

1989 births
Living people
Footballers from Buenos Aires
Italian people of Argentine descent
People with acquired Italian citizenship
Italian footballers
Italy youth international footballers
Association football forwards
Parma Calcio 1913 players
Ternana Calcio players
A.C. Carpenedolo players
F.C. Südtirol players
U.C. AlbinoLeffe players
U.S. Cremonese players
Budapest Honvéd FC players
Győri ETO FC players
S.S.D. Lucchese 1905 players
MTK Budapest FC players
Szombathelyi Haladás footballers
Talleres de Remedios de Escalada footballers
Serie A players
Serie B players
Serie C players
Nemzeti Bajnokság I players
Italian expatriate footballers
Expatriate footballers in Switzerland
Expatriate footballers in Hungary
Italian expatriate sportspeople in Switzerland
Italian expatriate sportspeople in Hungary